St. Clair West is a subway station on Line 1 Yonge–University in Toronto, Ontario, Canada. It spans the block north of St. Clair Avenue West to Heath Street, between Bathurst Street and Tweedsmuir Avenue. The station serves the local communities of Forest Hill South, Humewood, Bracondale Hill and Casa Loma.

The addition of automatic sliding doors, accessible fare gates, and elevators made the station fully accessible in 2017. Wi-Fi service is available at this station.

History 
This station was opened in 1978, as part of the subway line extension from St. George station to Wilson Station. Its south end was in the City of Toronto while its north end was in what was then the Borough of York.

The sports field of St. Michael's College School is directly above the length of the station and a Loblaws supermarket is located over the entrance on the north side of St. Clair Avenue.

The 1995 Russell Hill subway incident occurred on August 11, 1995, between this station and Dupont station to the south on the southbound line. The impact site was closer to Dupont Station than to St. Clair West Station.

On September 3, 2017, the new Flexity Outlook streetcars were introduced to the 512 St. Clair streetcar route. Because the new streetcars are twice the length of the older CLRV streetcars, the underground platform assignments for streetcars at St. Clair West station had to be changed. Previously, streetcars for both directions shared the west-side platform for arrivals and the north-side platform for departures, each able to accommodate two CLRV streetcars. Now the west-side platform handles arrivals and departures for one eastbound streetcar, and the north-side platform for one westbound streetcar.

Entrances 

The station has three entrances, all of which currently accept Presto cards:

 The main entrance is located on the northeast side of Bathurst and St. Clair beside Loblaws. It has elevator access to all station levels.
 An entrance is located on the southeast corner of Bathurst and St. Clair which provides, via a tunnel, access to the main entrance and also to an automatic entrance to the platform level.
 An unstaffed automatic entrance is located on Heath Street adjacent to Tichester Road just east of Bathurst Street. This entrance has an elevator from street level to the concourse level, but not to the platform level. This automatic entrance only accepts Presto cards.

Architecture and art 
St. Clair West, designed by the TTC's in-house architects, is a colourful station featuring a wide variety of interior finishes such as ceramic tiles, brick and sculptural concrete surfaces. Backlit orange panels and an abstract tile pattern resembling a barcode at platform level distinguish the station from others in the system. The TTC built its first underground streetcar loop at this station circling an exceptionally spacious waiting area for connections to surface routes. Buskers often take advantage of the acoustics caused by the station's open architecture. Wilson is the one other station on the line which, due to its complexity, the TTC chose to design themselves.

The abstract enamel mural Tempo by Gordon Rayner is on the mezzanine-level bridge crossing the tracks.

The station has a second artwork, The Commuters by Rhonda Weppler and Trevor Mahovsky, installed during the 2016/17 station renovations. The artwork consists of many bronze snails of about 50-centimetres in size clinging to the walls of a staircase leading from the bridge over the subway tracks to the streetcar/bus platform. The work was inspired by Pierre Berton’s book for children: The Secret World of Og.

Subway infrastructure in the vicinity 
South of the station, the subway tunnel cuts southeast through the Nordheimer Ravine, where the emergency exit used in the Russell Hill accident is located, then continues in a bored tunnel south beneath Spadina Road and under Casa Loma to Dupont Station.

Also constructed by cut-and-cover north of the station, the tunnel runs northwest through the Cedarvale Ravine to Eglinton West Station.

Connections

These routes can be boarded in the underground loop:

To connect to these bus routes, passengers can walk outside the station to Bathurst Street:

References

External links 

Line 1 Yonge–University stations
Toronto streetcar loops
Railway stations in Canada opened in 1978
Railway stations with vitreous enamel panels
1978 establishments in Ontario